Ardley Cutting and Quarry is a  biological and geological Site of Special Scientific Interest north-west of Bicester in Oxfordshire. The site contains a Scheduled Monument, Ardley Wood moated ringwork, a Norman defended enclosure.

The quarry and railway cutting exposes rocks dating to the Bathonian stage of the Middle Jurassic, about 167 million years ago. The site has calcareous grassland with diverse vertebrates, including the internationally protected great crested newt.

References

Berkshire, Buckinghamshire and Oxfordshire Wildlife Trust
Sites of Special Scientific Interest in Oxfordshire
Geological Conservation Review sites